Anjula Perera (born 19 December 1979) is a Sri Lankan former cricketer. He played in 79 first-class and 62 List A matches between 1998/99 and 2009/10. He made his Twenty20 debut on 17 August 2004, for Panadura Sports Club in the 2004 SLC Twenty20 Tournament.

References

External links
 

1979 births
Living people
Sri Lankan cricketers
Panadura Sports Club cricketers
Sebastianites Cricket and Athletic Club cricketers
Place of birth missing (living people)